Vår jul is the second joint album by Swedish artists Sanna Nielsen, Shirley Clamp & Sonja Aldén released in Sweden in 2010, physically through Lionheart International and digitally through Universal Music.

Although the album didn't match the success of its predecessor, the album was still a commercial success peaking at number six on the Swedish Albums Chart and was certified gold in the country.

Background
Following the success of their 2008 collaborative album, Our Christmas, Shirley Clamp, Sanna Nielsen, and Sonya Aldén recorded and released a second Christmas album. The major difference with this one, is that the majority of the songs are performed in Swedish. They also co-wrote a number of the songs on the album.

Reviews
Scandipop gave the album a positive review; "We’ve come over all warm, festive, and cozy after listening to clips of all of the tracks from the new Sanna, Shirley & Sonja Christmas album, ‘Vår Jul’. There's not a single clip that we don't like the sound of – they're all absolutely beautiful.".

StubbyChristmas compared the sound to Wilson Phillips "...but only when they're singing harmony vocals. Often, though, they just trade leads".

Track listing
The album was released digitally and physically on November 3, 2010 with 12 tracks.

 All tracks are performed by Sanna Nielsen, Shirley Clamp & Sonja Aldén.

Charts

Weekly charts

Year-end charts

Certifications

References

External links

2010 Christmas albums
Sanna Nielsen albums
Shirley Clamp albums
Sonja Aldén albums
Swedish-language albums
Christmas albums by Swedish artists